Steven Mitchell, Steve Mitchell, or Stephen Mitchell may refer to:

Stephen Mitchell (British politician) (1884–1951), Scottish politician
Stephen A. Mitchell (politician) (1903–1974), American attorney and political party official
Stephen Mitchell (theatre impresario) (1907–2000), English theatre manager and Lord's Taverners president
Stephen Mitchell (judge) (born 1941), British judge
Stephen Mitchell (translator) (born 1943), American poet, translator and anthologist
Stephen A. Mitchell (psychologist) (1946–2000), American psychologist
Stephen Mitchell (journalist) (born 1949), British journalist and media executive
Stephen A. Mitchell (Scandinavian scholar) (born 1951), Harvard professor of Scandinavian and Folklore
Steve Mitchell (basketball) (born 1964), American basketball player
Steve Mitchell (sailor) (born 1970), British sailor
Steve Mitchell (comics), see Sun Devils
Steve Mitchell (Texas politician), American mayor and city council member
Steven Mix Mitchell (born 1996), Garland boxer
Stephen Mitchell (EastEnders), fictional character in BBC soap opera EastEnders